The Diocese of Gozo is a Latin bishopric (diocese) of the Catholic Church in Malta, and the only suffragan in the ecclesiastical province of the Metropolitan Archdiocese of Malta, together covering the insular state.

The diocese comprises the island of Gozo (seventeen miles west of the Maltese capital Valletta) and the islet of Comino.

History 
On a central plateau the ruined fortifications of an ancient town contain the cathedral church and public buildings, outside of which is a large suburb.

Up to the year 1864, Gozo formed part of the then Roman Catholic Diocese of Malta, but Pope Pius IX, acceding to requests by the clergy and the people, erected it into a separate, then exempt diocese, i.e. immediately subject to the Holy See. On 16 March 1863, Michael Franciscus Buttigieg, a native of Gozo, was appointed titular Bishop of Lita and deputy auxiliary of the Archbishop-Bishop of Malta, for the Island of Gozo. He was consecrated at Rome on 3 May of the same year, on 22 September 1864, was created first bishop of the new Diocese of Gozo, and on the 23rd day of the following month made his entry into the new cathedral. This Church, dedicated to the Assumption of Mary, is the oldest parish in Gozo. It was already working as a parish in 1241 and goes back to Byzantine period. Through the efforts of Pietro Pace, vicar-general of the diocese, a diocesan seminary was established on the site formerly occupied by the San Giuliano Hospital, the revenues of which were appropriated to the new institution. This seminary was inaugurated 3 November 1866, and by the express desire of Pius IX placed under the direction of the Jesuits.

On the death of Buttigieg, Paolo Micallef, Superior General of the Augustinian Order, was made Bishop of Città di Castello and appointed administrator of the Diocese of Gozo. He left Gozo in May, 1867, and in 1871 became Archbishop of Pisa. His successor to the administration of the diocese was Antonius Grech Delicata Testaferrata, titular Bishop of Chalcedon, a native of Malta, who in 1868 was appointed Bishop of Gozo, and as such assisted at the First Vatican Council. Grech Delicata's divested himself of his own patrimony in favour of the poor; he died on the last day of 1876.

On 12 March 1877, Pietro Pace, native of Gozo, was appointed to succeed Grech Delicata, and was consecrated in Rome by Cardinal Edward Henry Howard. Under his administration the seminary was augmented by the installation of a meteorological observatory, which was inaugurated by Padre Denza, director of the Vatican Observatory. During this administration an episcopal educational institute for girls was also established, under the care of the Sisters of St. Vincent de Paul, to whom was also entrusted the direction of the annexed orphan asylum. The same bishop provided the diocese with a new episcopal palace and new monasteries, besides laying out large sums of money on the cathedral.

In 1889 Pace was promoted Archbishop of Rhodes and Bishop of Malta. His successor in the See of Gozo was G. M. Camilleri, a native of Valletta (b. 15 March 1842). Under Camilleri's administration the first diocesan synod was celebrated, in October, 1903. This synod was necessary as the diocese was still governed under the outdated rules of the Synod of Malta of 1703. Constitutions and decrees were also promulgated and published.

In May 1990, it was visited by Pope John Paul II.

Bishops of Gozo

Special churches 
 Cathedral of the Assumption of Mary in Victoria - The cathedral church of Gozo was built in 1697-1703, by Lorenzo Gafa. Its ground plan is in the form of a Latin cross. The cathedral is also the annual pilgrimage site of the Grand Priory of the Mediterranean of the Hospitaller Order of Saint Lazarus of Jerusalem. Its interior is adorned with fine paintings. The "Massagiere di Maria", an Italian periodical, is recognized in the Diocese of Gozo as the official organ of the sanctuary of the Blessed Virgin of Ta' Pinu.
 Basilica and Collegiate Parish of St George in Victoria
 Rotunda of Xewkija in Xewkija
 Basilica and National Shrine of the Blessed Virgin of Ta' Pinu in Għarb
 Basilica and Collegiate Parish of the Visitation in Għarb
 Basilica and Collegiate Parish of St Peter and St Paul in Nadur
 Basilica and Collegiate Parish of the Nativity of Mary in Xagħra

Important dates
 23 April: Memorial of Saint George - Patron Saint of the Diocese
 22 June: Feast of the Blessed Virgin of Ta' Pinu
 15 August: Solemnity of the Assumption of Mary  - Patroness of the Maltese Archipelago.
 16 September: Anniversary of the establishment of the Diocese
 11 October: Dedication of the Diocesan Cathedral  
 21 October: Memorial of Saint Ursula - Patron Saint of the Diocese

Parishes

References

Sources and external links
 Gozo Diocese own site
 GigaCatholic with incumbent biography links

See also 

Culture of Malta
History of Malta
List of Churches in Malta
List of monasteries and convents in Malta
Religion in Malta

Gozo
Roman Catholic dioceses in Malta